Marek Jaskółka (born 19 April 1976) is a Polish triathlete. He competed at the 2008 and 2012 Summer Olympics.

References

1976 births
Living people
Polish male triathletes
Olympic triathletes of Poland
Triathletes at the 2008 Summer Olympics
Triathletes at the 2012 Summer Olympics
Sportspeople from Ruda Śląska
20th-century Polish people
21st-century Polish people